Tyrants Destroyed and Other Stories is a collection of thirteen short stories by Vladimir Nabokov. All but the last one were written in Russian by Nabokov between 1924 and 1939 as an expatriate in Berlin, Paris, and Menton, and later translated into English by him and his son, Dmitri Nabokov. These stories appeared first individually in the Russian émigré press. The last story was written in English in Ithaca, New York in 1951.  The collection was published in 1974.

Stories included 
 "Tyrants Destroyed"
 "A Nursery Tale"
 "Music"
 "Lik"
 "Recruiting" 
 "Terror"
 "The Admiralty Spire"
 "A Matter of Chance"
 "In Memory of L. I. Shigaev"
 "Bachmann"
 "Perfection"
 "Vasiliy Shishkov"
 "The Vane Sisters"

Short story collections by Vladimir Nabokov
1975 short story collections